Dinothrips is a genus of thrips in the family Phlaeothripidae.

Species
 Dinothrips hainanensis
 Dinothrips juglandis
 Dinothrips longicauda
 Dinothrips monodon
 Dinothrips spinosus
 Dinothrips sumatrensis

References

Phlaeothripidae
Thrips
Thrips genera